2744 Birgitta, provisional designation , is a stony asteroid and a Mars-crosser on an eccentric orbit from the innermost regions of the asteroid belt, approximately  in diameter. It was discovered at the Kvistaberg Station of the Uppsala Observatory in Sweden on 4 September 1975, by Swedish astronomer Claes-Ingvar Lagerkvist, who named it after his daughter, Anna Birgitta Angelica Lagerkvist. The S-type asteroid has a rotation period of 9.0 hours.

Orbit and classification 

Birgitta is a Mars-crossing asteroid, a dynamically unstable group between the main belt and the near-Earth populations, crossing the orbit of Mars. There are more than 5,000 numbered Mars-crosser – or approximately 1% of the overall population of small Solar System bodies – with a perihelion between 1.3 and 1.666 AU.

Birgitta orbits the Sun at a distance of 1.5–3.1 AU once every 3 years and 6 months (1,275 days; semi-major axis of 2.3 AU). Its orbit has an eccentricity of 0.33 and an inclination of 7° with respect to the ecliptic. The body's observation arc begins with its official discovery observation at Kvistaberg in 1975.

Physical characteristics 

Birgitta is a common, stony S-type asteroid in both the Tholen and SMASS classification.

Rotation period 

In October 2010, a rotational lightcurve of Birgitta was obtained from photometric observations by American astronomer Brian Skiff. Lightcurve analysis gave a well-defined rotation period of 8.994 hours with a brightness amplitude of 0.18 magnitude. The result supersedes a previous observation by the discoverer Claes-Ingvar Lagerkvist from the 1970s, which showed a period of 9.02 hours and an amplitude of 0.4 magnitude. In December 2014, astronomers at the Palomar Transient Factory in California measured as similar period of 8.97 hours with a brightness variation of 0.32 magnitude.

Diameter and albedo 

According to the survey carried out by the NEOWISE mission of NASA's Wide-field Infrared Survey Explorer, Birgitta measures 2.67 kilometers in diameter and its surface has a high albedo of 0.304, while the Collaborative Asteroid Lightcurve Link assumes a standard albedo for stony asteroids of 0.20 and calculates a diameter of 3.29 kilometers based on an absolute magnitude of 14.78.

Birgitta is a mid-sized Mars-crossing asteroid, smaller than 1065 Amundsenia (10 km), 1139 Atami (9 km), 1474 Beira (15 km), 1508 Kemi (17 km), 1011 Laodamia (7.5 km), 1727 Mette (9 km), 1131 Porzia (7 km), 1235 Schorria (5.5 km), 985 Rosina (8 km), 1310 Villigera (14 km) and 1468 Zomba (7 km), and significantly smaller than the largest members of this dynamical group, namely, 132 Aethra (40 km), 2204 Lyyli (25 km) and 512 Taurinensis (20 km).

Naming 

This minor planet was named after Anna Birgitta Angelica Lagerkvist, daughter of the discoverer Claes-Ingvar Lagerkvist. The official naming citation was published by the Minor Planet Center on 15 May 1984.

Notes

References

External links 
 Asteroid Lightcurve Database (LCDB), query form (info )
 Dictionary of Minor Planet Names, Google books
 Asteroids and comets rotation curves, CdR – Observatoire de Genève, Raoul Behrend
 Discovery Circumstances: Numbered Minor Planets (1)-(5000) – Minor Planet Center
 
 

002744
Discoveries by Claes-Ingvar Lagerkvist
Named minor planets
002744
002744
19750904